Cedar Grove is a census-designated place (CDP) in Santa Fe County, New Mexico, United States. It is part of the Santa Fe, New Mexico Metropolitan Statistical Area. The population was 747 at the 2010 census.

Description
Cedar Grove was formerly a stage and freight stop. It has developed into a Santa Fe suburb. New Mexico "cedars" are abundant in the town.

Geography
Cedar Grove is located at  (35.168716, -106.172585).

Demographics

As of the census of 2000, there were 599 people, 224 households, and 167 families residing in the CDP. The population density was 30.5 people per square mile (11.8/km2). There were 249 housing units at an average density of 12.7 per square mile (4.9/km2). The racial makeup of the CDP was 84.97% White, 0.50% African American, 0.67% Native American, 0.83% Pacific Islander, 9.68% from other races, and 3.34% from two or more races. Hispanic or Latino of any race were 20.20% of the population.

There were 224 households, out of which 35.3% had children under the age of 18 living with them, 64.3% were married couples living together, 6.3% had a female householder with no husband present, and 25.4% were non-families. 18.3% of all households were made up of individuals, and 6.7% had someone living alone who was 65 years of age or older. The average household size was 2.67 and the average family size was 3.09.

In the CDP, the population was spread out, with 27.5% under the age of 18, 4.3% from 18 to 24, 31.1% from 25 to 44, 27.9% from 45 to 64, and 9.2% who were 65 years of age or older. The median age was 40 years. For every 100 females, there were 96.4 males. For every 100 females age 18 and over, there were 92.0 males.

The median income for a household in the CDP was $42,750, and the median income for a family was $47,560. Males had a median income of $41,146 versus $43,462 for females. The per capita income for the CDP was $16,585. About 16.0% of families and 16.3% of the population were below the poverty line, including 9.2% of those under age 18 and 27.5% of those age 65 or over.

Education 
It is within Moriarty-Edgewood School District.

See also
 List of census-designated places in New Mexico

References

External links

Census-designated places in Santa Fe County, New Mexico
Census-designated places in New Mexico